Johannes Nolten can refer to:

 Johannes Nolten Sr. (1888–1944), Dutch Olympic wrestler
 Johannes Nolten Jr. (1908–1974), Dutch Olympic wrestler, and son of the above